Porter is an unincorporated community in Gallia County, in the U.S. state of Ohio.

History
Porter was platted in 1830. A variant name was Pine Grove. A post office called Porter was established in 1834, the name was changed to Porter in 1923, and the post office closed in 1959.

References

Unincorporated communities in Gallia County, Ohio
Unincorporated communities in Ohio